Moskenes is a municipality in Nordland county, Norway. The municipality comprises the southern part of the island of Moskenesøya in the traditional district of Lofoten. The administrative centre of the municipality is the village of Reine. Other villages include Sørvågen, Hamnøy, and Å.

The  municipality is the 321st largest by area out of the 356 municipalities in Norway. Moskenes is the 333rd most populous municipality in Norway with a population of 982.

The municipal government owes  (as of 2022), and the significance of this debt makes it difficult to find other municipalities that are interested in merging with Moskenes.

History
The municipality was established on 1 July 1916 when the southern part of Flakstad Municipality was separated to become Moskenes. Initially, Moskenes had a population of 1,306.

On 1 January 1964, the municipalities of Flakstad and Moskenes were reunited, this time under the name "Moskenes". Prior to the merger, Moskenes had 2,001 residents and the new municipality of Moskenes had 4,068 residents. This new municipality did not last long because on 1 January 1976, Flakstad broke away again to once again form a separate municipality. This left Moskenes with 1,705 residents.

Name
The municipality (originally the parish) is named after the old Moskenes farm ("Muskenes" – 1567), since the first Moskenes Church was built there. The first element is probably derived from the word mosk/musk which means  "sea spray" and the last element is nes which means "headland". (See also Moskenstraumen.)

Coat of arms
The coat of arms was granted on 12 September 1986. The official blazon is "Azure, a gurge argent". This means the arms have a blue field (background) and the charge is a vortex spiral. The spiral has a tincture of argent which means it is commonly colored white, but if it is made out of metal, then silver is used. The blue color in the field and the spiral were chosen to represent vortexes or whirlpools, such as the Moskenstraumen, which appear in the channel just south of the island of Moskenesøya when the tide comes in, making it a hazardous channel. The arms were designed by Arvid Sveen.

Culture

Churches
The Church of Norway has one parish within the municipality of Moskenes. It is part of the Lofoten prosti (deanery) in the Diocese of Sør-Hålogaland.

Attractions
Moskenes is among the most scenic municipalities in all Norway, and the picturesque fishing villages of Hamnøy, Reine, Sørvågen, Moskenes, Å, and Tind all have a dramatic backdrop of jagged peaks rising above the Vestfjorden. The historic Glåpen Lighthouse is located just east of Sørvågen.

Between Lofotodden, the southwestern tip of the Lofoten chain, and the offshore island of Mosken, there is the tidal current of Moskenstraumen. This is better known internationally as the Maelstrom, feared by all sailors. On the isolated northwestern coast of the island, there are also interesting Stone Age cave paintings.

Government
All municipalities in Norway, including Moskenes, are responsible for primary education (through 10th grade), outpatient health services, senior citizen services, unemployment and other social services, zoning, economic development, and municipal roads. The municipality is governed by a municipal council of elected representatives, which in turn elect a mayor.  The municipality falls under the Lofoten District Court and the Hålogaland Court of Appeal.

Municipal council
The municipal council  of Moskenes is made up of 17 representatives that are elected to four year terms. The party breakdown of the council is as follows:

Geography
Moskenes has a subarctic climate (Köppen Dfc). The municipality of Moskenes lies near the southern end of the Lofoten archipelago on the southern part of the island of Moskenesøya. The Vestfjorden lies to the east, the Moskenstraumen strait lies to the south, and the Norwegian Sea lies to the west.

Climate

Notable residents

 Birger Eriksen (1875 in Flakstad – 1958) naval commander at Oscarsborg Fortress, where the German cruiser Blücher was sunk in 1940
 Rolv Thesen (1896 in Moskenes – 1966) a Norwegian poet, literary researcher and literary critic
 Rolf Bendiksen (born 1938 in Moskenes) a Norwegian politician. Mayor of Moskenes, 1983–1987
 Lillian Hansen (born 1957 in Moskenes) a bus driver, member of parliament, mayor
 Hans Erik Dyvik Husby (1972 – ?) known as Hank von Hell, punk rock musician, lived in Moskenes

Gallery

References

External links
Municipal fact sheet from Statistics Norway 

 Video:Driving the E10 road in Moskenes

 
Municipalities of Nordland
Populated places of Arctic Norway
Fishing communities
1916 establishments in Norway